The Fite-Fessenden House is a historic house in Lebanon, Tennessee, U.S.. It is now home to the Wilson County Museum.

History
Construction on the house began in 1852. It was built for Dr James Leonidas Fite, a surgeon who went on to serve in the Confederate States Army during the American Civil War. After the war, his daughter Margaret Harsh founded a private all-girl school in the house known as the Alberta School.

In 1921, the house was purchased by Mr Fessenden, the owner of the Fessenden Coal Company. It was later inherited by his wife, Sallie Barry Fessenden. After her death, it became the Wilson County Museum.

The house has been listed on the National Register of Historic Places since July 5, 1985.

References

Houses on the National Register of Historic Places in Tennessee
Greek Revival architecture in Tennessee
Italianate architecture in Tennessee
Houses in Wilson County, Tennessee
Museums in Wilson County, Tennessee
History museums in Tennessee